Arthur Furer (28 March 1924 – 8 November 2013) was a Swiss musician and composer.

Life 
From 1952 to 1988, he was music teacher at the Municipal Seminar Marzili and directed choirs. In 1955, he was rewarded at the 6th G. B. Viotti "Concorso Internazionale di Musica". In 1966, he was awarded the Pro-Arte Foundation Prize for his own composition, and in 1984 he was awarded the Music Prize of the Canton of Bern. In his own words, he was "associated with a contemporary school".

Furer died in Bern at the age of 89.

References

External links 
 

Swiss classical violinists
Swiss classical violists
Swiss composers
1924 births
2013 deaths
People from Worb